Branka Karnjus is a Croatian football goalkeeper. She played for Krka Novo Mesto in Slovenia's Women's League and the 2009–10 Champions League and ŽNK Rijeka in Croatia's First Division.

She played the 2011 World Cup qualification for the Croatian national team.

References

1973 births
Living people
Croatian women's footballers
Croatia women's international footballers
Expatriate women's footballers in Slovenia
Women's association football goalkeepers
ŽNK Krka players
Croatian Women's First Football League players
ŽNK Rijeka players
Croatian expatriate women's footballers
Croatian expatriate sportspeople in Slovenia